NIRA Dynamics AB is a Swedish company focusing on research and development of signal processing and control systems for the automotive industry. It supplies automotive original equipment manufacturers (OEMs) and suppliers in Europe, North America, Latin America, and Asia with its products and systems. In 2021, the number of vehicles equipped with NIRA's main product, TPI, exceeded the benchmark of 75,000,000.

History
NIRA was founded in 2001 and is located at Mjärdevi Science Park in Linköping, Sweden.

During the early period, NIRA Dynamics developed the first two of its products: the anti-spin system NSC and a positioning system MAP.

NSC received the Volvo Technology Award and until 2004 was featured in the Volvo S40 and V40 models under the name DSA (Dynamic Stability Assistance). Since 2007, NSC is in series production and featured in a line of motorcycles from one of the world leading motorcycle manufacturers.

In 2008, NIRA was presented the European Automotive Chassis Product of the Year Award by Frost & Sullivan for its product TPI.

Since 2014, NIRA has broadened its product portfolio with RSI (Road Surface Information), TGI (Tire Grip Indicator), LWI (Loose Wheel Indicator).

Since 2017, NIRA has started working in the road maintenance space, where they provide their products Winter Road Insights and Road Health to cities, authorities, road operators and road contractors.

Since 2020, NIRA has been collecting road surface information data from regular passenger vehicles. The data is used to improve road safety, by either supporting drivers, assisting vehicles or providing the data to the road maintenance industry. In 2020, NIRA launched Road Surface Alerts with the Volkswagen Group, providing slipperiness warnings to drivers.

NIRA Dynamics holds an ISO 9001:2000 certificate stating that it has efficient and structured processes and tools to manage collaborative development projects in international environments.

Technology and products
NIRA Dynamics' core product is its Tire Pressure Indicator (TPI), an indirect tire-pressure monitoring system (TPMS) capable of detecting underinflation simultaneously in up to four tires. At the moment, TPI is installed in several Audi models (the A1, A3, A4, A5, A6, A7, A8, Q3, Q5, Q7, TT and many more); several Volkswagen models (Polo, Golf, Jetta, Beetle, Scirocco, Passat, Tiguan, Touran, Sharan and many more); several SEAT and Skoda models; as well as the Chery Arrizo 7 and the MG 3. It is also fitted to many Volvo, Fiat and Renault vehicles. The system meets the American FMVSS 138 and the European ECE R-64 regulations on tire pressure monitoring systems. TPI is a software component that uses both relative rolling radius information as well as wheel oscillation measurement. It estimates tire pressure mainly from the signals of the wheel speed sensors that are part of the anti-lock braking system (ABS) and electronic stability control system (ESC). It gets active shortly after a reset which triggers a self-learning process. A reset needs to be initiated by the driver when the tires have been changed or the pressure adjusted. TPI does not require any in-wheel pressure sensors and RF (radio frequency) components. The Audi TT series was the first to be equipped with TPI, in 2006. The Audi A4 and A5 models followed the next year. TPI can be fit into different electronic stability control hardware hosts, including those of Continental AG, Robert Bosch GmbH, and TRW Automotive.

NIRA Dynamics is developing sensor fusion based systems for different vehicle applications. Sensor fusion or sensor data fusion is the use of information from several different physical sensors to compute new virtual sensor signals. The virtual sensors can be of two different types: improved versions of physical sensor signals, or soft sensors that have no direct physical counterpart among the sensors used.

TPI ABS is a TPI version for vehicles with built-in anti-lock braking system (which is standard in most cars) but no electronic stability control system (which is not standard, particularly in emerging markets).

Loose Wheel Indicator (LWI) detects when the wheel bolts/nuts have come loose on at least one wheel position and the wheel starts to separate from the hub. It warns the driver who then can bring the vehicle to a safe halt before the wheel falls off. As TPI and all other NIRA products, this software-based function does not require any additional sensors.

Tire Grip Indicator (TGI) constantly estimates the available friction between the road and the tires. Unlike comparable functions, it does not need any additional sensors like tire-mounted sensors or cameras. This makes TGI very cost effective.

Road Surface Information (RSI) includes the friction estimation function of TGI, but goes one step further by completing this with road roughness information and detecting irregular events like potholes, speedbumps etc. This information can either be used directly in the car, for example to adapt the chassis, or be distributed via cloud services to other vehicles, road authorities etc.
In the winter 2015/2016, NIRA started a field study in Sweden where a fleet of taxi vehicles has been equipped with RSI delivering for example an online, real-time friction map of the roads of Gothenburg, Sweden.
In 2020 the product was taken to market full-scale and was in 2021 installed in over one million passenger vehicles, collecting road surface data.

Road Surface Alerts (RSA) - Based on world-leading friction estimation technology, Road Surface Alerts is the next generation local hazard warning system providing the most precise slipperiness warnings ever.

Road Surface Conditions (RSC) - Designed to make cars smarter and roads safer, Road Surface Conditions combines and assesses data from connected vehicles, RWIS, radar/satellite images, and weather prognoses to provide a real-time picture of the road status – with unmatched data coverage. This, in turn, helps enable SAE Level 2 and 3 vehicle functions in all kinds of weather and road conditions.

See also 
Blowout (tire)
Tire maintenance
Tire uniformity

References

External links
 Official website
 Mynewsdesk press room

Automotive engineering
Automotive software
Vehicle safety technologies
Technology companies of Sweden
Electronics companies of Sweden
Swedish brands
Companies based in Östergötland County